Charlie Cunningham (1890 – 30 January 1942) was an English footballer who played as an inside left for Stockport County, Tranmere Rovers and Ashton National.

References

Stockport County F.C. players
Tranmere Rovers F.C. players
Ashton National F.C. players
1890 births
1942 deaths
Footballers from Manchester
Association football inside forwards
English footballers